Volutoconus hargreavesi is a species of sea snail, a marine gastropod mollusk in the family Volutidae, the volutes.

Description
Length of shells vary from 65 to 128 mm.

Distribution

References

Volutidae
Gastropods described in 1872